The military sketching board was designed to be used on horseback. The board incorporates a compass, an inclinometer, a ruler, a roll of paper and an arm buckle.

Description
The board was designed to be strapped to the arm of a cavalryman on the arm that he held the horses bridle with. The board is attached to the leather buckle with a swivel joint. This means that the user can twist the whole board on their arm to ensure that the compass alignment is clear. The board incorporates a compass for this purpose. The user can then use the supplied ruler. In earlier versions this was attached with rubber bands but later versions had the ruler permanently attached. As a sketch was completed then the paper roll was advanced to supply more clear paper. On the back of the board is an Inclinometer to allow the severity of ascents to be recorded.

History
The board was originally designed by Colonel W H Richards, who taught military surveying at the Royal Military Academy Sandhurst in about 1880 before he went on to teach in India.  The board was improved by Major (later Colonel) William Willoughby Cole Verner who had briefly Professor of Topography at the Sandhurst. He patented improvements in 1887 and 1891 and the board became known as Verner's. Verner published his own guide to the sketching board in 1889. However the board was not universally loved and some referred to it as "The damnable cavalry sketching board".

In the 1930s very similar devices were used by solo aviators. The device was strapped to the arm or leg and was loaded with maps rather than sketching paper.

One of these devices is in the collection of the National Museums of Scotland.

References

Cavalry
Surveying instruments